John Adolphus of Schleswig-Holstein-Sonderburg-Plön ( or Hans Adolf; 8 April 1634, Ahrensbök – 2 July 1704 Ruhleben) was the second Duke of Schleswig-Holstein-Sonderburg-Plön, which had been created by a division of the Duchy of Schleswig-Holstein-Sonderburg.

Life 
He was born on 8 April 1634 in Ahrensbök, the eldest son of the first Duke of Plön, Joachim Ernest and Dorothea Augusta of Schleswig-Holstein-Gottorp.

From 1645 to 1650 he went on a grand tour around the countries of Europe, including England and France. He was accompanied by his brother, Augustus, who was one year younger. In 1671 he inherited the dukedom from his father. On 25 October 1671 he was bestowed with the Order of the Elephant, the highest Danish order of knighthood, becoming the 124th member of the order.

In 1684 he had the first hunting lodge built in Traventhal; this was followed in 1685 by St. John's Church, Plön and in 1690 the parish church of Plön. In 1694 he led the Dutch army at the Siege of Huy. John Adolphus took part in several of the major wars of his time, including the Ottoman wars and handed over the running of his duchy during those times largely to his mother and his wife. During his reign the Treaty of Traventhal was signed at the ducal hunting lodge in Traventhal, a milestone during the Great Northern War.

In 1704 went to Hungary and fought against the Kurucs with the forces of Holstein-Plön and Denmark. He participated in the battle of Smolenice.

Family 
John Adolphus married Dorothea of Brunswick-Wolfenbüttel, a daughter of Rudolf Augustus of Brunswick-Wolfenbüttel. They had two children:

 Adolphus Augustus (born 29 March 1680; died 29 June 1704), married Elisabeth Sophia of Schleswig-Holstein-Sonderburg-Nordborg (1683-1767). She was the daughter of Rudolf of Schleswig-Holstein-Sonderburg-Norburg, and granddaughter of Frederick, Duke of Schleswig-Holstein-Sonderburg-Norburg.
 their son, Leopold Augustus (1702-1706), died as a child
 Dorothea Sophia (1692–1765), married Adolphus Frederick III, Duke of Mecklenburg

Duke John Adolphus died on 2 July 1704 in Ruhleben, a few days after his son, Adolphus Augustus, had been killed in a riding accident. Because Leopold Augustus, son of Adolphus Augustus and grandson of John Adolphus died in childhood in 1706, the estate went to the John Adolphus' nephew, Joachim Frederick, from the line of Schleswig-Holstein-Nordborg.

Ancestors

Sources

External links 

 Family line of Schleswig-Holstein-Plön 
 The Gentlemen's Tour by Two Princes  
 of Plön with a portrait of John Adolphus on emergency money 

Dukes of Schleswig-Holstein-Sonderburg-Plön
1634 births
1704 deaths
Generals of the Holy Roman Empire